Hưng Thịnh is a  commune in Trảng Bom District, Đồng Nai Province, Vietnam. It is the intermediary point between Trảng Bom and Thống Nhất District.

In 2014, the estimated population was 9,136, and the population density was 530 people/km².

References

Districts of Đồng Nai province